New Purchase can refer to any of several territories ceded by Native American tribes to Great Britain or the United States.

New Purchase (1768) is the territory in Pennsylvania ceded by the Iroquois Confederacy to Great Britain by the Treaty of Fort Stanwix.
New Purchase (1818) is the territory in Indiana ceded by the Miami, Delaware, Wyandot and others to the United States by one of the Treaties of St. Mary's.
New Purchase (1842) is the territory in Iowa ceded by the Sauk and Meskwaki to the United States via the Sac and Fox treaty of 1842